is a Japanese surname.

Notable people
 , Japanese model, who was the first Miss Universe to originate from Asia
 , Japanese artist, who contributed to Castlevania
, Japanese discus thrower
 , Japanese artist
 , singer and actress, and member of the Japanese girl band AKB48
 , Japanese video game designer formerly employed by Konami
 Ippei Kojima (born 1944), Japanese badminton player
 , Japanese comedian and actor
, Japanese footballer
 Ken-Ichi Kojima (1930–1971), Japanese-American geneticist
 , Japanese artist
 , Japanese singer and member of the girl group AKB48
, Japanese actress and singer
, Japanese television personality, gravure idol and sportscaster
, Japanese footballer
 , Japanese professional wrestler
 , Japanese mixed martial artist
 , president & CEO of Mitsubishi Corporation (2004- )
 , Japanese comedian (tarento)

Fictional
 Genta Kojima (or George Kojima), a fictional character in Case Closed/Detective Conan
 Yoshiyuki Kojima, a fictional character in Chobits
 Yuki Kojima, a fictional character in Whistle!
 Kojima, a fictional character in Teenage Mutant Ninja Turtles
 Kojima is a type of nuclear particle in the Armored Core video-game series.

Japanese-language surnames